Arbar was one of the five main divisions of the kingdom of Rama in prehistoric Awadh. Arbar extended southwards from Gomti to the Sai River.

See also
 Uttara Kosala
 Silliana
 Pachhimrath
 Purabrath

References

Awadh
Regions of Uttar Pradesh
History of Uttar Pradesh